"It's On (Move to This)" is a single by New Zealand R&B group 3 the Hard Way, released in 2003. The single entered the New Zealand Singles Chart at number one, becoming the group's second number-one single, more than 10 years after their first number-one hit, "Hip Hop Holiday".

Track listing
New Zealand enhanced CD single
 "It's On (Move to This)" (single edit)
 "It's On (Move to This)" (remix)
 "It's On (Move to This)" (video)

Charts

Weekly charts

Year-end charts

References

2003 singles
Number-one singles in New Zealand